Sadia Jabbar Qasim is a Pakistani television and film producer. She is the founder of Sadia Jabbar Production which was established in 2014. It produces television serials for private channels in Pakistan. she got married with Pakistani film maker Qasim Ali mureed.

Career 

In 2016, she produces her first feature film Balu Mahi. Some of their work include Mera Naam Yousuf Hai (2015), Takkabur (2015), Farwa Ki ABC (2016), Ghamand (2018), Khafa Khafa Zindagi (2018) and Mere Bewafa (2018).
Balumahi is available at Netflix and aired on Geo tv.

Television

Current productions

Former productions

References

External links
Official website
Sadia Jabbar Productions on IMDb

Living people
Pakistani film producers
People from Karachi
Year of birth missing (living people)